Catherine Mbabazi commonly known as Cathy Patra is a Ugandan dancer, choreographer, fashion model and businesswoman. She won the Best Choreography in Africa award and her group RVC won Best Dancing Group in Africa at the 2021 Zikomo Awards in Zambia.

Life and career
Cathy Patra was born in Nsambya Hospital to Mr.Mwesigwa Emmanuel and Mrs. Mwesigwa Rose. She is the fourth of the six children in her family. She went to Old Kampala Primary School, Mbarara Army Boarding Secondary School(MABSS) for her O Level, then Bombo Secondary School for A Level. She then attended Ndejje University and did a Certificate in Accounting and Finance and then upgraded to Bachelor of Business Administration. Started dancing in her earliest teenage years at family gatherings and school before joining a professional church group called Miracle Teens at Miracle Centre Church in 2004. In 2014, she founded her own dance group called RVC. She soon afterwards co-owned The Fix Cosmetics in Kampala with Georgine Komuhendo, then Red Events Ltd with Sheebah Karungi and a number of other businesses in Kampala.

She used dance to showcase issues woman face in our society for example access to education, inequality at work places, domestic  violence, skills and knowledge empowerment, sexual harassment in the entertainment industry at Nation Theatre Uganda in a dance production titled I am Female. She has choreographed for Sheebah, Rema and Spice Diana.

Nominations and awards
Patra won the Best  Choreographer in Africa award and her dance group RVC won Best Dancing Group in Africa at Zikomo Awards in Zambia in 2021. Best Dressed Female on East Africa Fashion Awards Blue Carpet 2020, Best Female Dancer Sweet Heart Awards 2016.

Discography

References

Living people
1992 births
Ugandan dancers
Ugandan models